"Californication" is a song by American rock band Red Hot Chili Peppers from their seventh album, Californication (1999). Released as a single in June 2000, it reached  number 69 on the US Billboard Hot 100, number 16 on the UK Singles Chart, and number one on the Billboard Mainstream Rock Tracks and Modern Rock Tracks charts. It was the third number-one Californication single in Iceland.

"Californication" has remained one of the band's most popular and most performed live songs, appearing in almost every setlist since its live debut and making it the band's third-most performed song, with over 500 performances.

Recording
In Kiedis's book, Scar Tissue, the author reveals that the band had enormous difficulty in putting the song together. Kiedis had written the lyrics, which he felt were some of the best he had written, but the band could not decide how the song should sound musically.

As they struggled with the song it seemed like they would not be able to finish it in time to include it on the album, until one day Frusciante walked into the studio and exclaimed that he had "figured it out." He played the song as he visualised it, and it went from being a song that could have been an afterthought to becoming one of the Red Hot Chili Peppers' greatest hits, similar to the way "Under the Bridge" was conceived.

In Rick Rubin's podcast "Broken Record", Chad Smith revealed that for quite some time, the song was "like reggae, like Bad Brigade" and "that the melody was there, but the music...." After a while, everybody thought it was not coming together and the song was nearly thrown out before John came in with a new arrangement.

Composition
The song explores the dark side of Hollywood and the export of culture through the movie industry. The song begins "Psychic spies from China try to steal your mind's elation." Kiedis says in his book Scar Tissue that he took the inspiration for the line from hearing a woman on a New Zealand street ranting about "psychic spies in China".

The track also makes references to topics such as pornography ("hardcore soft porn") and plastic surgery ("pay your surgeon very well to break the spell of aging") and even some pop culture references including Nirvana singer Kurt Cobain and David Bowie. The "spheres" are a reference to Music of the Spheres, an ancient philosophical concept that regards proportions in the movements of celestial bodies as a form of music ("Cobain, can you hear the spheres singing songs off Station to Station?").  Other cultural references include the Beach Boys ("They're just another Good Vibration"), Star Wars ("and Alderaan's not far away") and Star Trek ("Space may be the final frontier but it's made in a Hollywood basement"). The phrase "First-born Unicorn" refers to Dorothy Stratten, whose life was covered in the book The Killing of the Unicorn.

The song begins in the key of A minor with Frusciante picking the chords of Am and F for twelve measures, before picking the chords of C-G-F-Dm then going back and picking Am and F for 8 more measures before picking C-G-F-Dm again. For the pre-chorus Frusciante then strums a combination of Am and Fmaj7 chords for twelve measures, until the chorus when he strums the chords C-Gmaj7-Dm9-Am, then C-G-Dm9. It is notable for its sparse combination of guitar and bass notes in the main riff; Frusciante drew inspiration from "Carnage Visors" by The Cure.

After the second chorus, a 16-measure guitar solo is played by Frusciante, along with a modulation to A major. After the solo, the key returns to the original A minor, and a third verse and final chorus is played.

Music video
The video, directed by Jonathan Dayton and Valerie Faris, takes the form of a fictional open world video game that depicts each of the band members on some sort of adventure in a California setting, particularly San Francisco and Los Angeles, which ends when the world is ravaged by an earthquake and the avatars are replaced by the live action band members. The music video for "Californication" is the group's most watched video on YouTube, having officially reached a billion views on December 5, 2022.

Video game
On March 1, 2022, Spanish game developer Miquel Camps Orteza created a video game based on the song's music video. The player plays as one of the four band members. The game has seven different levels, each based on a scene from the music video. Orteza wrote, “I wanted to play that game so bad! It’s 2022 and I haven’t seen anyone made the game so I challenged myself to create it. I have selected some epic moments from the video and turned into 7 levels each one with different game mechanics, I hope you like this game."

Live performances
"Californication" is the band's third-most performed song and has been performed at almost every show since 1999.

Formats and track listings
CD single 1 
 "Californication" – 5:21
 "I Could Have Lied" (Live) – 4:26
 "End of Show Brisbane" (Live) – 8:11

CD single 2 
 "Californication" – 5:21
 "I Could Have Lied" (Live) – 4:26
 "End of Show State College" (Live) – 9:27

EP 
 "Californication" – 5:21
 "End of Show Brisbane" (Live) – 8:11
 "I Could Have Lied" (Live) – 4:26
 "End of Show State College" (Live) – 9:27

Personnel
Red Hot Chili Peppers
 Anthony Kiedis – lead vocals
 John Frusciante – electric guitar, backing vocals, keyboard 
 Flea – bass
 Chad Smith – drums

Charts

Weekly charts

Year-end charts

Certifications

Release history

References

1999 songs
1999 singles
Animated music videos
Kurt Cobain
Number-one singles in Iceland
MTV Video Music Award for Best Direction
Music videos directed by Jonathan Dayton and Valerie Faris
Red Hot Chili Peppers songs
Songs about fame
Songs about musicians
Song recordings produced by Rick Rubin
Songs about California
Songs about Los Angeles
Songs written by Anthony Kiedis
Songs written by Chad Smith
Songs written by Flea (musician)
Songs written by John Frusciante
Warner Records singles